Chisom is a given name for both genders in the Igbo Culture in Nigeria. 

Chisom means "God follows me" and/or "God is with me"

Notable people with the name include:

Chisom Chikatara (born 1994), Nigerian footballer
Chisom Egbuchulam (born 1992), Nigerian footballer
Chisom Leonard Johnson (born 1993), Dutch footballer

Unisex given names